Pandivirilia melaleuca is a Palearctic species of stiletto fly in the family Therevidae.

References

External links
Images representing  Pandivirilia 

Therevidae
Insects described in 1847